The San Pedro Chapel is a historic chapel that was built in 1932 at 5230 E. Ft. Lowell Rd. in Tucson, Arizona. It replaced a chapel built in 1915 that was destroyed by a tornado in 1929.

The San Pedro Chapel was built over the ruins of the destroyed chapel and dedicated in 1932. Both chapels were constructed by the El Fuerte community. The San Pedro Chapel, also known as San Pedro de Fort Lowell (St. Peter's at Fort Lowell Mission), was listed in the National Register of Historic Places on April 28, 1993, ref.: #93000306. It is also listed as a City Historic Landmark.

Gallery

References

Churches in Pima County, Arizona
Roman Catholic chapels in the United States
National Register of Historic Places in Tucson, Arizona
Properties of religious function on the National Register of Historic Places in Arizona
Churches completed in 1915
Mission Revival architecture in Arizona